Stefan Atanasov Aladzhov (born 18 October 1947) is a former Bulgarian football defender. In his career, he played mostly for Levski Sofia.

In 1970 Aladzhov was named Bulgarian Footballer of the Year. For the Bulgaria national football team he played in two editions of the FIFA World Cup, in 1970 and in 1974.

Awards
Levski Sofia
Bulgarian champion: 1968, 1970, 1974, 1977, 1979
Bulgarian cup winner: 1970, 1971, 1976, 1977, 1979
Bulgarian Footballer of the Year: 1970

References

External links
 Profile at fifa.com
 Profile at LevskiSofia.info

1947 births
Living people
Bulgarian footballers
Bulgaria international footballers
Association football defenders
PFC Levski Sofia players
PFC Spartak Varna players
First Professional Football League (Bulgaria) players
1970 FIFA World Cup players
1974 FIFA World Cup players
Footballers from Sofia